Anne d'Escars de Givry (29 March 1546 – 19 April 1612) was a French Benedictine churchman, supporter of the Ligue, and cardinal.

Biography
He was born in Paris, the son of Jacques de Pérusse, Seigneur d'Escars and Françoise de Longwy, Dame de Pagny and de Mirebeau.

He became bishop of Lisieux in 1584. He was created Cardinal in 1596, without the knowledge of Henry IV of France, and had to give up his see. He became bishop of Metz in 1608.

See also

Notes

Books

External links
 

1546 births
1612 deaths
Clergy from Paris
French Benedictines
Bishops of Lisieux
Bishops of Metz
17th-century French cardinals
House of Pérusse des Cars